The 2017–18 London & South East Premier season is the 31st season of level 5 in the London and South East region of English rugby union. It consists of thirteen teams from England and one from the Channel Island of Guernsey. It will be the first season organised under the London & South East Premier title following the rename from "National League 3 London & SE" during the off-season. This decision was made by the Rugby Football Union owing to the fact that it was felt that the league title was misleading as it was not a nationwide league but was instead the highest level of rugby in the London and South East region.

The winners are promoted to National League 2 South with the runners-up entering a play-off against the runner-up of South West Premier. The bottom three are relegated to either London 1 North or London 1 South.

Teams 
Fourteen teams will compete in the 2017–18 London & South East Premier season. Nine of the teams competing made up the previous year's National League 3 London & SE league. Leaving the league were Tonbridge Juddians who were promoted to National League 2 South as champions of the previous year. Wimbledon were also promoted from the league after winning a play-off against National League 3 South West runners-up, Dings Crusaders. Amersham and Chiltern, Chichester and Colchester were all relegated from the league due to finishing in the relegation places.

Promoted into the league are Tring as champions of London 1 North and Sidcup as winners of London 1 South. The final promoted team is Tunbridge Wells who finished second in London 1 South and defeated Chingford in a promotion play-off to earn back-to-back promotions and play at Level 5 for the first time in their history. Barnes also joined the league after being relegated from 2016–17 National League 2 South. Owing to an imbalance in the leagues between the regions, Towcestrians were level transferred into London & South East Premier from Midlands Premier.

Locations

Table

References 

2017-18
5
rugby union
rugby union